"Salomé" is a Latin pop/dance song written by Estéfano, produced by Ronnie Foster and performed by Puerto Rican singer Chayanne. It was released as the third single from the studio album Atado a Tu Amor (1998), nominated to the Grammy Award for Best Latin Pop Album. The song became a success in Spain where it peaked at number-one. It also was certified gold in France and reached 12 position in charts from that country.

Chart performance

Year-end charts

Certifications and sales

References

1999 singles
Chayanne songs
Spanish-language songs
Number-one singles in Spain
Songs written by Estéfano
Sony Discos singles
1998 songs